Mohamed Aiman Moukhliss Agmir (born 6 February 2000), known as Moha Moukhliss or just Moha, is a Spanish footballer who plays as a midfielder for FC Barcelona Atlètic, on loan from FC Andorra.

Club career
Born in Madrid to Moroccan parents, Moha joined Real Madrid's La Fábrica in 2010, aged ten, from EDM San Blas. On 2 September 2019, after finishing his formation, he was loaned to RC Celta de Vigo's reserves in Segunda División B, for one year.

Moha made his senior debut on 18 September 2019, starting in a 4–2 home win over UD Melilla, and scored his first senior goal the following 2 February by netting the equalizer in a 1–1 away draw against Marino de Luanco. He returned to Castilla on 4 August 2020, after Celta did not exercise his buyout clause, but moved to another reserve team, Real Valladolid Promesas on a four-year contract sixteen days later.

On 24 August 2022, Moha left Valladolid, and moved to Segunda División newcomers FC Andorra two days later, on a three-year deal. He made his professional debut on 9 October, coming on as a second-half substitute for Rubén Bover in a 0–0 away draw against Málaga CF.

On 31 January 2023, Moha was loaned to FC Barcelona Atlètic for the remainder of the 2022–23 Primera Federación.

References

External links

1997 births
Living people
Footballers from Madrid
Spanish people of Moroccan descent
Spanish footballers
Moroccan footballers
Association football midfielders
Segunda División players
Primera Federación players
Segunda División B players
Real Madrid Castilla footballers
Celta de Vigo B players
Real Valladolid Promesas players
FC Andorra players
FC Barcelona Atlètic players
Spain youth international footballers
Spanish expatriate footballers
Expatriate footballers in Andorra
Spanish expatriate sportspeople in Andorra